Mordellistena csiki is a species of beetle in the genus Mordellistena of the family Mordellidae. It was discovered in 1977 and can be found in Hungary and Switzerland.

References

csiki
Beetles described in 1977
Beetles of Europe